Beaufort County Community College is a public community college in Washington, North Carolina.

Academics
The college has classes and programs for business and industry services, healthcare programs, human resources development, public safety, and occupational extensions.

History
In December 1967, the College was officially chartered as Beaufort County Technical Institute. The vocational and technical programs of the Institute were complemented by a college parallel program which opened in 1968 in conjunction with East Carolina University. In 1979, community college status was granted.

References

External links
Official website

North Carolina Community College System colleges
Education in Beaufort County, North Carolina
Educational institutions established in 1967
Two-year colleges in the United States
1967 establishments in North Carolina